The Bernard (and Fern) Schwartz House, also known as Still Bend, is a 3,000 sq foot Frank Lloyd Wright-designed house in Two Rivers, Wisconsin. It is considered to be Wright's Life magazine "Dream House," and is a rare example of a two-story Usonian house. Wright originally developed the design for the house for Life in 1938. The Schwartz House is one of the few Wright homes that allow guests to spend the night. This property is believed to have the oldest, continuously operating in-floor heating system in the country.

Gallery

References

Storrer, William Allin. The Frank Lloyd Wright Companion. University Of Chicago Press, 2006,  (S.271)

External links

 Bernard Schwartz House official site

Historic house museums in Wisconsin
Frank Lloyd Wright buildings
Museums in Manitowoc County, Wisconsin
Houses in Manitowoc County, Wisconsin